Kudapa is a village in Krishna district of the Indian state of Andhra Pradesh. It is located in Reddigudem mandal.

References

Villages in Krishna district